Asparagus virus 1 (AV-1) is one of the nine known viruses that affects asparagus plants. It is in the Potyviridae family. Initially reported by G. L Hein in 1960, it is a member of the genus Potyvirus and causes no distinct symptoms in asparagus plants. The only known plant that can get AV-1 is asparagus plants. It is spread by aphids vectors, which means that aphids do not cause the AV-1, but they do spread it.

Morphology

The virus consists of a capsid. The virus capsid is not enveloped. Capsid / nucleocapsid is elongated with helical symmetry. The capsid is filamentous, flexuous with a clear modal length with a length of 740 nm and a width of 13 nm. Axial canal is indistinct, the basic helix is obscure.

Physicochemical and physical properties

There is one sedimenting component(s) found in purified preparations. The sedimentation coefficient is 146 S20w. A260/A280 ratio is 1.24. The thermal inactivation point (TIP) is at 50-55 °C. The longevity in vitro (LIV) is 2–11 days. Although the titer is dependent on the host, the decimal exponent (DEX) of the dilution endpoint is usually around 3-4.

Nucleic acid

The MR of the genome constitutes 6% of the virus by weight. The genome is monopartite, only one particle size is recovered of linear, positive-sense, single-stranded RNA.

Proteins

Proteins constitute around 94% of the virus by weight.  The viral genome encodes structural proteins and non-structural proteins.

Lipids

Lipids are not reported.

Antigenicity

The virus is serologically related to bean yellow mosaic, lettuce mosaic, and turnip mosaic viruses. The virus does not show serological relationships to beet mosaic, iris mild mosaic, and potato Y viruses.

Diagnostics and reference collections

Asparagus virus 1 occurs naturally in asparagus plants that often are infected with tobacco streak, Asparagus 2, or cucumber mosaic viruses. Few, if any, symptoms are caused. Asparagus 1 virus is readily separated from the others because its host range is limited and it causes only necrotic local lesions in Chenopodium quinoa and no symptoms in Cucumis sativus, Phaseolus vulgaris, or Nicotiana tabacum.

Transmission and vector relationships

The virus is transmitted by mechanical inoculation. It is not transmitted by contact between hosts, by seeds nor by pollen. The virus is transmitted by arthropods of the order Hemiptera, family Aphididae; Aphis craccivora, Myzus persicae. The principal natural vector(s) are Myzus persicae. The virus is not transmitted by Aphis gossypii, Macrosiphum euphorbiae. The virus is transmitted in a non-persistent manner.

Experimental hosts and symptoms

Under the experimental conditions, susceptibility to being infected by the viruses is found in several families. Susceptible host species are found in the Alliaceae, Amaranthaceae, Asparagaceae, Chenopodiaceae, Tetragoniaceae. The following species were susceptible to experimental virus infection: Allium tuberosum, Asparagus officinalis, Chenopodium album, Chenopodium amaranticolor, Chenopodium capitatum, Chenopodium quinoa, Gomphrena globosa, Tetragonia tetragonioides. 
Experimentally infected hosts mainly show symptoms of necrotic local lesions.

Experimentally infected insusceptible hosts

Families containing insusceptible hosts: 

Alliaceae
Amaranthaceae
Caryophyllaceae
Chenopodiaceae
Compositae
Cruciferae
Cucurbitaceae
Gramineae
Labiatae
Leguminosae-Papilionoideae
Liliaceae
Pedaliaceae, or Solanaceae, Umbelliferae.

Species inoculated with the virus that do not show signs of susceptibility:

Allium cepa
Allium fistulosum
Amaranthus retroflexus
Apium graveolens
Beta vulgaris
Brassica campestris ssp. rapa
Capsicum frutescens
Celosia cristata
Chenopodium murale
Cucumis sativus
Cucurbita pepo
Datura stramonium
Daucus carota
Dianthus caryophyllus
Glycine max,
Gomphrena globosa
Lactuca sativa
Lilium elegans
Lycopersicon esculentum
Nicotiana benthamiana
Nicotiana clevelandii
Nicotiana glutinosa
Nicotiana sylvestris
Nicotiana tabacum
Ocimum basilicum
Petunia x hybrida
Phaseolus vulgaris
Pisum sativum
Sesamum indicum
Solanum tuberosum
Vicia faba
Vigna unguiculata
Vigna unguiculata ssp. sesquipedalis
Zea mays
Zinnia elegans

Maintenance and propagation hosts

The most commonly used maintenance and propagation host species are Asparagus officinalis, Chenopodium amaranticolor, C. quinoa, Tetragonia tetragonioides.

Histopathology

The virus can be best detected in leaves, stems, roots, and mesophyll of the infected plant. Virions are found in the cytoplasm.

Cytopathology

Inclusions are present in infected cells. Inclusion bodies in the host cell are found in the cytoplasm. Cytoplasmic inclusions are pinwheels. Inclusions do not contain mature virions.

Geographical distribution

The virus is probably distributed worldwide (wherever asparagus is grown commercially).

Notes
Asparagus infected with Asparagus 1 and 2 viruses are significantly more susceptible to damage caused by Fusarium oxysporum f. sp. asparagi.

References

General sources
Bertaccini, A, Marani, F. and Passarelli, V. (1984). Atti Giornate Fitopatol., 1984, Sorrento, Vol. 3, p. 437.
Bertaccini, A, Giuncheoli, L. and Poggi Pollini, C. (1990). Acta Hort. 271: 279.
Evans, T.A., and Stephens, C.T. (1989). Phytopathology 79: 253.
Fujisawa, I., Goto, T., Tsuchizaki, T., and Chizuka, N. (1983). Ann. Phytopath. Soc. Japan 49: 299.
Gröschel, H. and Jan-Ladwig, R. (1977). Phytopath. Z. 88: 183.
Hein, A (1960). Phytopath. Z. 67: 217.
Hein, A (1969). Z. PflKrankh. PflPath. PflSchutz. 76: 395.
Howell, W.E., and Mink, G.I. (1985). Plant Dis. 69: 1044.
Mink, G.I. and Uyeda, I. (1977). Pl. Dis. Reptr 61: 398.
Montasser, M.S. and Davis, R.F. (1987). Plant Dis. 71: 497.
Yang, H.J. (1979). Hort. Sci. 14: 734

External links
ICTVdB - The Universal Virus Database: Asparagus virus 1
Family Groups - The Baltimore Method

Viral plant pathogens and diseases
Potyviruses